The Transpantaneira, also known as MT-060, is a road that crosses the pantanal, in the state of Mato Grosso in Brazil.

The road is a link between the city of Poconé and the town of Porto Jofre. It's 147 km long and crosses no less than 122 wooden bridges. The road provides opportunity for wild life watching, especially in dry season.

Transport in Mato Grosso
Pantanal
Highways in Mato Grosso